Sors (also, Soru and Sorus) is a village and municipality in the Lerik Rayon of Azerbaijan.  It has a population of 735.

References 

Populated places in Lerik District